Dali Podiashvili (sometimes Fodiashvili) (born 27 January 1948) is a Georgian painter.

A native of Tbilisi, Podiashvili studied at the Nikoladze Art School in that city from 1963 until 1968. In the latter year she matriculated at the Tbilisi State Academy of Arts, from which she graduated in 1974. In 1986 she joined the Artists' Union. In addition to working as a painter, she has taught art. She continues to exhibit her work throughout Georgia. Several of her paintings may be found in the collection of the Georgian Museum of Fine Arts.

References

1948 births
Living people
Women painters from Georgia (country)
20th-century painters from Georgia (country)
20th-century women artists
21st-century painters from Georgia (country)
21st-century women artists
Artists from Tbilisi
Tbilisi State Academy of Arts alumni